"Survival" is a song by American rapper Eminem. It premiered on August 14, 2013 to promote the multiplayer trailer for the video game Call of Duty: Ghosts, and was initially released as a pre-order bonus when pre-ordering the game. The song was officially released as the second single from The Marshall Mathers LP 2 on October 8, 2013. It features uncredited vocals in the chorus from Liz Rodrigues of the New Royales. Upon its single release, the song debuted at number 17 on the US Billboard Hot 100, and upon the album's release, it climbed to a new peak of number 16.

Release
In August 2013, following the release of Call of Duty: Ghosts multiplayer video, Eminem released a video explaining to his fans the new album would be released in the fall, and that a new music video was coming soon. It was also confirmed that the song would be featured within the game. This was the third time that an Eminem song was used to promote a Call of Duty game, with "'Till I Collapse" being used in the Call of Duty: Modern Warfare 2 trailer, and "Won't Back Down" being used in the Call of Duty: Black Ops trailer, in zombies mode as a hidden song and the end credits. The song is also featured on the soundtrack of WWE 2K19, being selected by AJ Styles to be included in the soundtrack.

The song is also heard in the end credits for Ghosts.

Music video
The official music video for "Survival" was released on October 8, 2013. The music video featured Eminem rapping in front of footage of Call of Duty: Ghosts featured on a projector, with additional shots featuring elements from the game such as dogs and soldiers in their in-game outfits. The final scene features Eminem revisiting the house featured on the cover of  The Marshall Mathers LP and The Marshall Mathers LP 2. The house was later demolished by the State of Michigan.

Live performances
Eminem performed the song on Saturday Night Live on November 2, 2013, along with "Berzerk", with Skylar Grey replacing Liz Rodrigues on backing vocals.

Critical reception
The song features rock guitars in a style that makes it similar to works from Eminem's Recovery, according to Luke Bainbridge of The Guardian. Los Angeles Times pop music critic Randall Roberts says that the song matches the "voluminous, venom-filled and explosive" levels of the work it accompanies. Roberts says the song features an aggressive rapper, "cuss-filled lines...the bombast of distorted electric guitar and a jumbo beat." He says that the DJ Khalil-produced song, which features the New Royales' Liz Rodrigues, "is a cliché-ridden couplet that sounds like it took as much time to imagine as it did to scribble on a scrap of paper." Rolling Stone Ryan Reed describes the song as hard-hitting with background music that classifies as "breakneck, arena-rock guitars and trashy drums."

Awards and nominations

Track listing
Digital Download

Chart performance

Weekly charts

Year-end charts

Certifications

Release history

References

Eminem songs
2013 singles
Interscope Records singles
Shady Records singles
Aftermath Entertainment singles
Songs written by Eminem
Rap rock songs
Song recordings produced by DJ Khalil
Songs written by DJ Khalil
2013 songs
Songs written by Erik Alcock